Wignacourt Tower, also known as Saint Paul's Bay Tower, is a bastioned watchtower in St. Paul's Bay, Malta. It was the first of six Wignacourt towers to be built, and the first stone was laid on 10 February 1610. It replaced the role of Ta' Tabibu farmhouse which was previously known as Dejma Tower. An artillery battery was added a century later in 1715. Today the tower is a museum of fortifications around the Maltese Islands.

Wignacourt Tower was the second tower to be built in the Maltese islands, after Garzes Tower on Gozo. It was also the first tower to be built on the main island. As Garzes Tower was demolished in 1848, Wignacourt Tower is now the oldest surviving watchtower in Malta.

History

By the end of the 16th century, Malta's harbour area was extensively fortified. However, the rest of the islands was virtually undefended, and the coastline was open to attacks by Ottomans or Barbary corsairs. This began to change in the early 17th century, when Martin Garzez, Grand Master of the Order of Saint John, allocated funds for the building of Garzes Tower on Gozo. Garzes' successor, Alof de Wignacourt, set out to build a series of towers around the coastline, which were personally funded by him and came to be known as the Wignacourt towers.

The first tower was built to protect St. Paul's Bay, and was called Wignacourt Tower after the Grand Master. On 7 November 1609, plans and a model of the tower were presented to the Order's council. The first stone of was blessed and laid on 10 February 1610, and the accompanying ceremony was personally attended by Wignacourt himself. The tower cost 6748 scudi, 7 tari and 10 grani to build.

Although there are claims that the tower was designed by Vittorio Cassar, he disappears from the Order's military records in around 1603. Cassar died in around June 1609, before work on the tower began. The architect of Wignacourt Tower was probably an unknown Maltese capomastro.

The tower was the only major fortification in the north of Malta until the construction of Saint Agatha's Tower in 1649. It had Qawra Tower (built 1638), Buġibba Battery (built 1715) and Mistra Battery (built 1761) in its line of sight.

A coastal battery was added to the tower in 1715 to house two 18-pounder guns. Buttressing was added to the lower half of the structure in around 1761.

After Malta fell under British rule, the tower began to be used as a police station. A postal agency was located within the police station between 1891 and 1921, and during this period a postmark reading "St. Paul's Bay" was used. The police station closed in 1931, and from 1937 to 1963 the tower was occupied by the Post and Telephone Department.

The tower's original entrance was on the first floor, and it was approached by a drawbridge from a flight of stone steps. The steps were removed in the 1950s when the road in front of the tower was widened. An entrance was added on the ground floor. The wheel of the drawbridge still exists, as well as the door and its key of the main entrance.

Present day

In 1967 the government issued a call for tenders for the lease of the tower, and it was leased to Din l-Art Ħelwa in 1970. It was restored between 1973 and 1976. During restoration, the tower's turrets were completely rebuilt. A marble plaque with the following inscription was installed above the ground floor entrance:

Since 1998, the tower has been a museum, and its exhibits include models of various fortifications found in the Maltese islands, reproductions of items used by the tower's occupants in the 17th and 18th centuries, old photos and a restored cannon.

In 2010, the 400th anniversary of the tower was celebrated by the St. Paul's Bay Local Council, the Festa Committee and Din l-Art Ħelwa by a series of events including re-enactments, tours, discussions and traditional Maltese folklore.

The tower was restored and cleaned once again in 2015.

In popular culture
The tower was depicted on a postage stamp issued by MaltaPost in 2006.

References

11. Farrugia Randon Stanley, Wignacourt Tower and Walks in St Paul's Bay

12. Farrugia Randon Stanley, Wignacourt Tower 400 Years

External links

National Inventory of the Cultural Property of the Maltese Islands

Wignacourt towers
Batteries in Malta
Defunct police stations in Malta
Post office buildings in Malta
Former post office buildings
Museums in Malta
Buildings and structures completed in 1610
Military installations established in 1715
Museums established in 1998
National Inventory of the Cultural Property of the Maltese Islands
1610 establishments in Malta
Limestone buildings in Malta
1715 establishments in Malta
Buildings and structures in St. Paul's Bay